Rudecindo is a Spanish given name. Notable people with the name include:

 Álbaro Rudesindo, Dominican Republic freestyle wrestler
 Rudecindo Alvarado (1792–1872), Argentine general

Spanish masculine given names